Mehrunnisa Parvez is an Indian writer of Hindi literature.

Biography
She was born in 1944, she published her first story in 1963 in Dharamayug magazine and has authored several short stories and novels in Hindi. Amma, published in 1967 and Samara, released in 1969 are two of her notable works. Besides, she has also published several short story anthologies and her works have been the subject of academic studies. The Government of India awarded her the fourth highest civilian honour of the Padma Shri, in 2005, for her contributions to Indian literature.

She is married to Shri Bhagirath Prasad, a retired Indian Administrative Service officer who is the first person to enter into this prestigious service from the state of Madhya Pradesh and current Member of Parliament from Bhind Lok Sabha Constituency in Madhya Pradesh. The couple lives in Bhopal, Madhya Pradesh.

See also 
 Hindi literature
 List of Hindi-language authors

References 

1944 births
Living people
Recipients of the Padma Shri in literature & education
Novelists from Madhya Pradesh
Indian women short story writers
Indian women novelists
20th-century Indian short story writers
Women writers from Madhya Pradesh
20th-century Indian novelists
20th-century Indian women writers